Bing Audio (also known as Bing Music) is a music recognition application created by Microsoft which is installed on Windows Phones running version 7.5 and above, including Windows Phone 8. On Windows Phone 8.1, and in regions where the Microsoft Cortana voice assistant is available, Bing Music is integrated with Cortana  and the music search history is a part of Cortana's "Notebook". The service is only designed to recognize recorded songs, not live performances or humming. Xbox Music Pass subscribers can immediately add the songs to their playlists. A unique feature compared to similar services is that Bing Audio continuously listens and analyzes music while most other services can only listen for a fixed amount of time. Bing Research developed a fingerprinting algorithm to identify songs.

On March 30, 2016 Microsoft announced they will create bots based on Bing features in Skype, which Bing Music was one such feature.

Availability

As part of Cortana (where supported) 
Australia
Canada
France
Germany
India 
Italy
Spain
United Kingdom
United States

As part of Bing Mobile 
Argentina
Austria
Belgium
Brazil
Denmark
Finland
Ireland
Mexico
Netherlands
New Zealand
Norway
Portugal
Sweden
Switzerland

See also
Gracenote's MusicID-Stream
Play by Yahoo Music
Shazam
 Sony TrackID
SoundHound
Groove Music (known as Zune in versions prior to Windows Phone 8, and as Xbox Music in Windows Phone 8.x)

References 

Windows Phone
Windows Phone software
Computer vision software
Augmented reality applications
Microsoft software